Carex myosurus is a tussock-forming species of perennial sedge in the family Cyperaceae. It is native to parts of Asia from India in the west to Vietnam and China in the east.

It was described by the botanist Christian Gottfried Daniel Nees von Esenbeck in 1834 as published in Contributions to the Botany of India.

See also
List of Carex species

References

myosurus
Plants described in 1834
Taxa named by Christian Gottfried Daniel Nees von Esenbeck
Flora of China
Flora of Vietnam
Flora of India
Flora of Bangladesh
Flora of Java
Flora of Myanmar
Flora of Nepal
Flora of the Philippines
Flora of Sulawesi
Flora of Sumatra
Flora of Tibet